Obert Moses Mpofu is a Zimbabwean politician, who served as Minister of Home Affairs from 2017 to September 2018. Previously he was Minister of Macro-Economic Planning and Investment Promotion; Minister of Industry and International Trade; Minister of Mines and Mining Development; and Minister of Transport and Infrastructure Development.  The Cabinet of Zimbabwe was later dissolved on 27 November 2017. He was reappointed as Minister of Home Affairs in Mnangagwa's first cabinet on 30 November 2017. The Culture portfolio was added to his ministry.  Mpofu was later removed from the Zimbabwe cabinet in September 2018.

Political career
Mpofu, previously the Governor of Matabeleland North Province, was appointed as Minister of Industry and International Trade in mid-April 2005, following the March 2005 parliamentary election. He was placed on the United States sanctions list in 2003.

At the beginning of 2014, Mpofu was reported to be seeking nomination from  ZANU-PF’s Matabeleland North provincial leadership for the position of  party Chairman. It was reported that his main rival for the position was the Speaker of the Zimbabwean Parliament, Jacob Mudenda. It is believed that Mpofu was one of the earliest ZPRA guerillas to be trained for the Zimbabwean Liberation War way back in the 1960s.

Ministry of Industry and Trade
Mpofu masterminded the freeze of basic commodities in Zimbabwe in mid-2007.  He was appointed by Robert Mugabe to lead the price monitoring regime that was created following the price-freeze.  He withdrew operating licenses from abattoirs across the country during the price freeze, a situation that resulted in beef becoming scarce in shops across the country.  In early 2008, he initiated the idea of 'people's shops' government run retail shops that would sell products cheaply.

2008 general election
Mpofu was nominated again as the ZANU-PF candidate for the House of Assembly seat from Umguza constituency in the March 2008 parliamentary election.  Mpofu was initially endorsed as unopposed, but Mark Mbayiwa challenged this in court and was successful in getting Mpofu's unopposed endorsement overturned.

Campaigning in Umguza, Mpofu singled out Simba Makoni as an agent of western imperialism.

Mpofu won the seat, receiving 7,065 votes and defeating two candidates of the two Movement for Democratic Change factions, Cornelius Mbayiwa (MDC-T) and Edmund Masuku (MDC-M), who respectively received 2,846 and 2,120 votes.  He also defeated Mark Mbayiwa, who ran as an independent and received 555 votes.

Minister of Mines
When the ZANU-PF–MDC national unity government was sworn in on 13 February 2009, Mpofu became Minister of Mines.

Minister of Transport and Infrastructure
Mpofu was appointed as Minister of Transport and Infrastructure in February 2014 and served until 2015.

Minister of Macro-Economic Planning and Investment Promotion
Mpofu was Minister of Macro-Economic Planning and Investment Promotion from 2015 until 2017.

Minister of Home Affairs
Following the dissolution of the Cabinet of Zimbabwe in 2017, it was announced that Robert Mugabe's successor Emmerson Mnangagwa had allowed only Patrick Chinamasa and Simbarashe Mumbengegwi to remain as acting ministers of Finance and Foreign Affairs respectively until the appointment of a new cabinet. However, Mpofu was appointed as Minister of Home Affairs and Culture in the new cabinet. Mpofu was later removed from the Mnangagwa Cabinet in September 2018.

References 

1951 births
Living people
Government ministers of Zimbabwe
Members of the National Assembly of Zimbabwe
ZANU–PF politicians
Zimbabwean individuals subject to U.S. Department of the Treasury sanctions